David Guion (born 30 September 1967) is a French professional football manager and former player who played as a defender. He is the manager of Ligue 2 club Bordeaux.

Early life
Guion was born in Le Mans, Sarthe.

Club career
Guion began his playing career in the B team at Lille in 1983. He went on to represent the Lille first team, making 51 appearances between 1988 and 1991. Guion then spent three seasons with Angers, where he played 88 league matches and scored once. He was also a part of the team that won promotion to Ligue 1 in 1993. He returned to Ligue 2 in 1994 with Sedan and went on to play for Mulhouse and Red Star 93, before ending his career with Istres in 2001.

Managerial career
Guion was appointed manager of Chambéry in the summer of 2010, and led the team to promotion to the Championnat de France amateur in his first season in charge. He was subsequently hired by Cannes in June 2011, but left the club in January 2012 after winning only 5 of his first 13 games as manager. Guion was appointed as assistant manager under Pascal Plancque at Boulogne the following month.

Managerial statistics

Honours

Player
Angers
Division 2 Group B: 1992–93

Manager
Chambéry
Championnat de France Amateur 2 Group D: 2010–11

Reims
Ligue Champagne-Ardenne: 2012–13
Championnat de France Amateur 2: 2015–16
Ligue 2: 2017–18

Individual
Ligue 2 Manager of the Year: 2017–18

References

External links

1967 births
Living people
Footballers from Le Mans
French footballers
Association football defenders
Lille OSC players
Angers SCO players
CS Sedan Ardennes players
FC Mulhouse players
Red Star F.C. players
FC Istres players
Ligue 1 players
Ligue 2 players
French football managers
AS Cannes managers
Stade de Reims managers
FC Girondins de Bordeaux managers
Ligue 1 managers
Ligue 2 managers